This list includes noteworthy large breweries, microbreweries, nanobreweries, brewpubs and taprooms in San Diego County, California.

4S Ranch
Karl Strauss Brewing Company – 4S Ranch

Alpine

 Alpine Beer Company

Carlsbad
 Burgeon Beer Co.
Carlsbad Brewing Company
Culver Beer Co.
Ebullition Brew Works – Carlsbad
Karl Strauss Brewing Company – Carlsbad
The Lost Abbey – Cardiff
 Pizza Port – Bressi Ranch
Pizza Port – Carlsbad Village
Rouleur Brewing Company

Chula Vista
 Thr3e Punk Ales Brewing Co.
Attitude Brewing Co.
Chula Vista Brewery
Groundswell Brewing Company – Chula Vista
 NOVO Brazil Brewing Company

Coronado 

 Coronado Brewing Co. – Coronado

Escondido

 Barrel Republic Brewing
Jacked Up Brewery
Little Miss Brewing
Prohibition Brewery
 Stone Brewing – Escondido

Encinitas
 Culture Brewing Co.

Imperial Beach 

 Coronado Brewing Co. – Imperial Beach
 Mike Hess Brewing – Imperial Beach
 Pizza Port - Imperial Beach

Julian
 Julian Beer Company
 Nickel Beer Company

La Mesa, CA 

 Little Miss Brewing

Lakeside, CA 

 Little Miss Brewing

Oceanside
Bagby Beer Company
 Breakwater Brewing Company
 Kilowatt Brewing – Oceanside
 Legacy Brewing Company
Oceanside Ale Works
Stone Brewing – Oceanside

Ramona
 ChuckAlek Independent Brewers

San Diego
Abnormal Beer Company
 Acoustic Ales Brewing Experiment
Align Brewing - Miramar
 Amplified Aleworks – East Village; Pacific Beach
 AleSmith Brewing Company - Miramar
Ataraxia Aleworks - Kearny Mesa
 Ballast Point Brewing Company – Little Italy; Miramar; Morena (Home Brew Mart)
 Bay City Brewing Co. – East Village; Point Loma
The Beer Company
 Bitter Brothers Brewery
Brew Zone SD - Miramar
 Coronado Brewing Co. – Bay Park
Deft Brewing
 Division 23 Brewing
 Duck Foot Brewing Company – East Village; Miramar
Embolden Beer Co, - Miramar
 Eppig Brewing – Point Loma
 Fall Brewing
Gravity Heights - Sorrento Mesa
 Green Flash Brewing Company - Mira Mesa
 Groundswell Brewing Company – Grantville
Harland Brewing Company - Scripps Ranch, One Paseo
 Hillcrest Brewing Company
Karl Strauss Brewing Company – Downtown San Diego; La Jolla; Sorrento Mesa
 Kilowatt Brewing – Kearny Mesa; Ocean Beach
Little Miss Brewing - Miramar, Normal Heights, East Village
 Mike Hess Brewing – Miramar; North Park; Ocean Beach
 Mikkeller – Little Italy; Miramar (San Diego)
 Mission Brewery
 Modern Times Beer – North Park; Point Loma
 New English Brewing Co. - Sorrento Mesa 
North Park Beer Company
 OB Brewery
 Original 40
 Pacific Beach Alehouse
 Pariah Brewing Company
 Pizza Port Brewing Company – Ocean Beach
 Protector Brewing - Miramar
Quantum Brewing - Kearny Mesa
 Rip Current Brewing – North Park
 Rough Draft Brewing Company
 Saint Archer Brewing
 San Diego Brewing Company
 Savagewood Brewing Company (formerly O'Sullivan Bros Brewing Co.) - Scripps Ranch 
 Second Chance Beer Company- North Park; Carmel Mountain
 Societe Brewing Company - Kearny Mesa
 South Park Brewing Company
Stone Brewing – J Street; Kettner; Liberty Station; San Diego Int'l Airport
 Thorn Brewing – Barrio Logan; Mission Hills; North Park
White Labs Brewing - Miramar

San Marcos
 The Lost Abbey – San Elijo; San Marcos
 Port Brewing Company
 Rip Current Brewing – San Marcos
 Stumblefoot Brewing Company
Wild Barrel Brewing Company

Santee 

 Groundswell Brewing Company – Santee

Solana Beach
 Culture Brewing Co.
 Pizza Port – Solana Beach

Vista
 Aztec Brewing Company
 Barrel Harbor Brewing
Belching Beaver Brewery
 Booze Brothers Brewing Company
 Ebullition Brew Works – Vista
 Eppig Brewing – Vista
 Latitude 33 Brewing
Mother Earth Brew Co.

Defunct breweries 

 32 North
Benchmark Brewing
Circle 9 Brewing
Council Brewing Company (formerly Red Topper Brewing Company)
Indian Joe Brewing Company
Iron Fist Brewing Company
Longship Brewery 
Offbeat Brewing Company 
 On-The-Tracks Brewery (Carlsbad)
Thunderhawk Alements
Toolbox Brewing.
 Twisted Manzanita Brewing Company (Santee)

See also

 Beer in San Diego County, California
 Beer in the United States
 List of breweries in California
 List of breweries in the United States
 List of microbreweries

References

External links
 San Diego Brewers Guild: SDBG

Breweries
Lists of breweries in the United States